The  Royal Gendarmerie is the national gendarmerie force of the Kingdom of Morocco, and comes under the joint-authority of the Minister Delegate to the Head of Government in charge of the administration of National Defense, Ministry of Interior and Minister of Justice.

History
During the period of the French protectorate in Morocco, the French national gendarmerie was tasked to maintain law and order in Morocco & Tunisia. The Moroccan Royal Gendarmerie was founded on 29 April 1957 by the late King Mohammed V following independence. A Dahir issued on 14 January 1958 further defined the principle and purpose of the Gendarmerie. This describes the Royal Moroccan Gendarmerie as a public force designed to guarantee public security and public order and the implementation of laws. Article 2 of the legislation attaches the Gendarmerie to the Royal Moroccan Armed Forces, then constituting a military force in its structure, administration and command forms. And its personnel consists of officers and NCOs. Structure of its functions has been determined by the two major different but complementary traditions. One of them has its roots in the history and culture of Morocco. The gendarmerie was born of the Moroccan administrative and political system which has ensured public security and maintenance of public order for centuries. The second tradition (Makhzen) is much newer.

Duties
The Royal Moroccan Gendarmerie is a force of police tasked mainly to ensure public safety, maintain order and ensure law enforcement.
Article 7 of the legislation stipulates the purpose of the gendarmerie is to ensure especially administrative, judicial and military policing activities directly and to help to the competent authorisations with the envisaged laws, which implies that the legislature has given great importance to policing duties.

Article 3 of the legislation further define responsible ministry on the gendarmerie roles, which are: 
 the National Defence Administration especially on the subjects of organisation equipment and military judicial policing ; 
 the Ministry of Justice for the implementation of judicial policing; and, 
 the Ministry of Interior on the subject of Common Administration Policing.

Judicial Police
The duties of the Royal Gendarmerie, in the field of judicial policing, have been determined by the Criminal Procedure Code of 1959. It performs all these duties under the administration of the royal prosecutor and control of the Court of Appeal. Duties consist of criminal investigation, evidence gathering evidence, arresting criminal and execute judge's order. The personnel of the Royal Gendarmerie participates in the implementation Judicial Policing. The Royal Gendarmerie who acts with the characteristics of being a judicial oriented police officer according to the Court of Penal Proceedings, Detects and determines the violation of the laws as a judicial police; and as a police of public force, informs the royal prosecutor of crimes and offences over which they have no jurisdiction.

To struggle against the continuous increase of crime and its international aspects and, on the other hand, the increase of the texts and their complexity the Royal Gendarmerie is modernising its methods and equipment continuously and reinforcing its efficiency by evaluating technical and scientific policing and criminal data. With this aim, two laboratories, which are under the administration of senior researchers, were established.

Administrative Police
In regards to duties of the Royal Gendarmerie, in the field of administrative policing, determined of a set of regulations dedicated to the maintenance of public order, including serve as border guard. On this role, the gendarmerie is responsible to the Ministry of Interior. The article 3 of the legislation allow gendarmerie to assists other ministerial departments such as: 
 Ministry of equipment, transport and logistics for traffic policing and protecting port and airport facilities.
 Ministry of agriculture, maritime fisheries, rural development and water and forests for prevention of illegal fishing control.

Organization
The organization of Royal Moroccan Gendarmerie is consist of:
 The General Headquarters, which conducts the overall main duties of the force.
 Territorial Gendarmerie
22 Regional Gendarmeries
64 Companies of Gendarmerie 
322 posts of Gendarmerie
 Mobile Gendarmerie
 Air and Maritime Gendarmerie
 Specialized Units, such as Groupe d'Intérvention de La Gendarmerie Royale.

Ranks

Officers

Enlisted

Inventory 

Small arms & Vehicles

 Vehicles: 
MRAP(unknown model/type)
Chevrolet Suburban

Aircraft

International co-operation
Since its foundation, the Royal Gendarmerie has laid efficient mutual co-operation basis with the different brotherhood organisations and also joined in the FIEP organization in 1999 which provides the framework the improvement of mutual relations and the maintenance of security in the region.

See also 
 List of gendarmeries

References

 Association of the European and Mediterranean Police Forces and Gendarmeries with Military Status 
 gendarmerie royale marocaine wordpress

External links
  Gendarmerie Royale Marocaine sur le réseau social Facebook
  Gendarmerie royale marocaine
  Portail la Gendarmerie Royale du Maroc
  Actualités de la Gendarmerie Royale du Maroc

Gendarmerie
Law enforcement in Morocco
1957 establishments in Morocco
Military units and formations established in 1957